The Cheyenne Kid is a 1940 American Western film directed by Raymond K. Johnson and written by Tom Gibson. The film stars Jack Randall, Louise Stanley, Kenne Duncan, Frank Yaconelli, Reed Howes and Charles King. The film was released on February 20, 1940, by Monogram Pictures.

Plot
After giving up gambling, the Cheyenne Kid is made foreman of his ranch and entrusted to purchase stock from a ranch owned by Ruth and Chet Adams. The Adams' ranch is in debt to Jeff Baker who doesn't want the sale to go through. He sends a pair of ne'er do wells to stop the deal by hook or crook.

Cast
Jack Randall as The Cheyenne Kid
Louise Stanley as Ruth Adams
Kenne Duncan as Chet Adams 
Frank Yaconelli as Manuel
Reed Howes as Jeff Baker
Charles King as Carson 
George Chesebro as Davis 
Forrest Taylor as Sheriff
Ed Brady as Farnum 
Lafe McKee as Roberts

References

External links
 

1940 films
1940s English-language films
American Western (genre) films
1940 Western (genre) films
Monogram Pictures films
Films directed by Raymond K. Johnson
American black-and-white films
1940s American films